Xenocranium ("strange skull") is a monotypic genus of extinct epoicotheriid mammal whose fossils were recovered from late Eocene of the American state of Wyoming. The single species is Xenocranium pileorivale.

Etymology
The name Xenocranium comes from the Ancient Greek words xenos and cranios, meaning "strange" and "skull" respectively, after its unique skull arrangement. The specific epithet is derived from pileus meaning "hat" and rivale meaning "brook", in reference to the nearby township of Hat Creek, Wyoming, U.S.A.

Description
Xenocranium pileorivale possesses many traits indicative of a subterranean lifestyle, including small eyes, an upturned snout, muscular arms with large attachment points for the triceps, teres major, and carpal and digital flexor muscles.

Palaeoecology
The holotype of Xenocranium pileorivale was recovered from the Brule Formation, 160 feet below the top of the Oligocene outcrop in the area, which correlates with the Chadronian age to the Orellan age under the NALMA classification. Later on, this layer was found to be from Priabonian age of late Eocene. Further remains have been found in the White River Formation of Nebraska. The animals from these formations constitute the White River Fauna, which included predators like Archaeotherium and Hyaenodon, and a large diversity of herbivorous mammals, such as the archaic horse Mesohippus, the cursorial rhinoceros Hyracodon, and the very common "oreodont" Merycoidodon.

Phylogenetic tree
The phylogenetic relationships of genus Xenocranium is shown in the following cladogram:

References

Palaeanodonta
Prehistoric mammal genera